Lenoir or LeNoire is a surname that may refer to:

Alban Lenoir (born 1980), French actor, screenwriter and stuntman
Alexandre Lenoir (1761–1839), French archaeologist
Charles-Amable Lenoir (1860–1926), French painter
Deommodore Lenoir (born 1999), American football player
Étienne Lenoir (1822–1900), Belgian engineer, inventor of the internal combustion engine
Étienne Lenoir (instrument maker) (1744–1832), French instrument maker, inventor of the repeating circle
Jean-Charles-Pierre Lenoir (1732–1807), French lawyer and police administrator
Jean Lenoir (composer) (1891–1976), French composer
J. B. Lenoir (1929–1967), African American blues musician
Lance Lenoir (born 1995), American football player
Maxime Lenoir (1888-1916), French flying ace
Noémie Lenoir (born 1979), French model and actress
Pierre Charles Lenoir French sculptor
Rosetta LeNoire (1911–2002), American actress, producer, and casting agent
William Lenoir (general) (1751–1839), American Revolutionary War officer
William B. Lenoir (1939–2010), American engineer and NASA astronaut
William "Billy" Lenoir (1942–2007), American tennis player
William Ballard Lenoir (1775–1852), American member of Tennessee state house of representatives

French-language surnames